Pierre Bernard (born 31 January 1989) is a French rugby union player, currently playing for the Rugby Pro D2 team Biarritz Olympique having previously been at Toulon.

References

External links
Itsrugby Profile
ERC Profile

1989 births
Living people
French rugby union players
Rugby union fly-halves